Manchu names are the names of the Manchu people in their own language. In addition to such names, most modern Manchus live in China and possess Chinese names.

Traditionally, Manchus were called only by their given names in daily life although each belonged to a clan with its own clan name (Manchu: hala). Each clan would be divided into several sub-clans (mukūn), but these did not have separate names.

Given names 
Manchus given names are distinctive. Generally, there are several forms, such as bearing suffixes "-ngga", "-ngge" or "-nggo", meaning "having the quality of"; bearing the suffixes "-tai" or "-tu", meaning "having"; bearing the suffix, "-ju", "-boo"; numerals or animal names.

Manchu given names were used solely or with titles but not with clan names. For example, Fiyanggū, who was from the Donggo clan, belonged to the Manchu Plain White Banner and distinguished himself in the campaigns against the Dzungars, was usually called "Fiyanggū be" (Lord Fiyanggū) since Fiyanggū (youngest) was a relatively major given name. Unlike Chinese and Europeans, he was not to be called by combination of family name and given name, i.e. Donggo Fiyanggū or Fiyanggū Donggo. Although we can find Aisin-Gioro Ulhicun and other figures, but it is a very modern practice. To specify the clan name, Manchus would have said something like "Donggo hala-i Fiyanggū" (Fiyanggū of the Donggo clan).

The Manchus had an immense variety of given names. For most of them, it is difficult to find the meanings. Some scholars try to categorize them. Erich Haenisch classified them into sixteen categories including animals (Eje: bull, Yelu: boar), plants (Fodo: willow, Maca: garlic), qualities (Ayan: big, Bayan: rich, Niowanggiyan: green), etc. Ch'en Chieh-hsien classified Manchu personal names into seven main categories. But there are many names that are not included in either categorization.

Some Manchu names seem nothing more than partial phonetic alternation of other ones. For example, the names of brothers of a clan were Ulušun, Hūlušun, Ilušun, Delušun, Fulušun and Jalušun in order of age, where only the initial syllables are changed. Another example is Nurhaci. His brothers were Šurgaci and Murhaci.

Like other non-Chinese terms, Manchu names are often transcribed into Chinese in a chaotic pattern since they were taken from Chinese sources. It is difficult to reconstruct original Manchu spellings from their Chinese transcription. Sometimes the first syllable of a Manchu given name is misinterpreted as a Chinese surname. For instance, the Manchu official Tulišen, who wrote a famous travel record, is mistaken for a Chinese man named "Tu Lishen".

The Jurchens and their Manchu descendants had Khitan linguistic and grammatical elements in their personal names like suffixes. Many Khitan names had a "ju" suffix.

Nikan (Han Chinese) was a common first name for Manchus. Nikan Wailan was a Jurchen leader who was an enemy of Nurhaci. Nikan was the name of one of the Aisin Gioro princes and grandsons of Nurhaci who supported Prince Dorgon. Nurhaci's first son was Cuyen, one of whose sons was Nikan.

During the Qing Dynasty, the Manchus gradually adopted two-character Chinese given names (but not family names), and used Manchu transcription of them. We can find a tendency to leave a space between two syllables of the name of an exalted personage in the Manchu script and to stick them together for common people. For example, the real name of the Qianlong Emperor was Hung li, which was derived from the Chinese name Hongli (弘曆). Certain combinations of Chinese sounds that never appeared at native Manchu terms make it difficult to determine syllable boundaries. The Manchus introduced what is called "Mongolian Sibe Syllable Boundary Marker" in Unicode. As the name says, it is formalized in the Sibe script but can also be found in Manchu literature. The marker represented as the grapheme of the middle form of letter A is put on a syllable boundary so that we can distinguish Guangying (Guwang'ing) from Guanjing (Guwanging), etc.

Clan names 

Like the Mongols, the Manchus were simply called by given name but they had their own clan names (hala in Manchu). Hala consisted of several mukūn, the unit of exogamy. Unlike hala, mukūn did not have corresponding names.

The Comprehensive Book of the Eight Manchurian Banners' Surname-Clans (八旗滿洲氏族通譜 Baqi Manzhou Zhizu Tongpu), compiled in the middle 18th century, records many Manchu clan names. Among more than a thousand names, about 600 names are the Manchus'.

Gioro, a major clan name, is the one of the few hala that has various variants such as Irgen, Silin and Šušu, possibly to distinguish from the imperial family name Aisin-Gioro.  Since the mid-to-late Qing Dynasty, Manchus have increasingly adopted Han Chinese surnames, and today, very few Manchus bear traditional Manchu family names.

See also
 List of Manchu clans
 Chinese name

Notes

References 

Stary, Giovanni. A Dictionary of Manchu Names: A Name Index to the Manchu Version of the "Complete Genealogies of the Manchu Clans and Families of the Eight Banners" Jakūn gūsai Manjusai mukūn hala be uheri ejehe bithe Baqi Manzhou shizu tongpu, Wiesbaden, Harrassowitz ed., 2000. Aetas Manjurica 8.

Manchu culture
Chinese given names
Manchu
Name